Iryna Kuksa (born 14 March 1997) is a Belarusian female acrobatic gymnast. With partner Viktar Lebedzeu, Kuksa achieved 8th in the 2014 Acrobatic Gymnastics World Championships.

References

1997 births
Living people
Belarusian acrobatic gymnasts
Female acrobatic gymnasts